Hungary has participated in the Eurovision Young Dancers 3 times since its debut in 1995.

Participation overview

See also
Hungary in the Eurovision Song Contest
Hungary in the Eurovision Young Musicians

External links 
 Eurovision Young Dancers

Countries in the Eurovision Young Dancers